= Nilavara =

Place or room which is usually part of traditional wooden houses in Kerala

Nilavara is a place or room which is usually part of traditional wooden houses in Kerala. "Nilam" means floor and "Ara" stands for covered area. Therefore, Nilam + Ara = Nilavara.

== Overview ==
The wooden houses are made of wooden walls, floors and ceiling. Above the ceiling coconuts and other agricultural products were usually kept. This is called "Thattinpuram"; means top of ceiling. The roof is above this space. Below the raised floor is the Nilavara. This space is used for keeping seeds during dry season for next sowing season. Rice, jackfruits, yam, and other products would be kept in the Nilavara.

There many such houses in Kerala and some of them are still used for above purposes.
